A by-election was held for the New South Wales Legislative Assembly electorate of Mudgee on 5 October 1876 because of the death of Stephen Goold.

Dates

Results

Stephen Goold died.

See also
Electoral results for the district of Mudgee
List of New South Wales state by-elections

References

1876 elections in Australia
New South Wales state by-elections
1870s in New South Wales